Song of the Bailing Man is the fifth Pere Ubu album, released in 1982. It was the final Pere Ubu album until 1988's The Tenement Year.

Production
Anton Fier replaced drummer Scott Krauss for the recording of the album. The band broke up shortly after producing Song of the Bailing Man.

Critical reception
Trouser Press wrote that "Fier’s lighter, jazzier playing sets the tone for an album that, for all its Euro-prog iconoclasm, never quite ignites." The Spin Alternative Record Guide called Song of the Bailing Man "more of a bouncy pop record, though Thomas is as gone as ever." In its review of the Architecture of Language 1979-1982 boxset, The Quietus wrote that "Tony Maimone's basslines play a bigger part on this record, making this LP more overtly poppy sounding than its predecessors."

Track listing
All lyrics by David Thomas; all music by Pere Ubu
"The Long Walk Home" – 2:34
"Use of a Dog"  – 3:17
"Petrified"  – 2:16
"Stormy Weather"  – 3:20
"West Side Story"  – 2:46
"Thoughts That Go by Steam" - 3:47  	
"Big Ed's Used Farms" - 2:24
"A Day Such as This" - 7:17 	
"The Vulgar Boatman Bird" - 2:49 	
"My Hat" - 1:19
"Horns Are a Dilemma" (Pere Ubu, John Thompson) - 4:21

Personnel
Pere Ubu
David Thomas – vocals, cover artwork
Mayo Thompson – guitar
Allen Ravenstine – EML synthesizers
Tony Maimone – bass
Anton Fier – drums, piano, marimba, percussion
with:
Eddie "Tan Tan" Thornton - trumpet
Technical
Paul Hamann - engineer
John Thompson - design

References 

Pere Ubu albums
1982 albums
Albums produced by Adam Kidron
Rough Trade Records albums
Cooking Vinyl albums
Fire Records (UK) albums